Old Friends is the second box set of Simon & Garfunkel songs, released in November 1997. The three-disc anthology collects most of the duo's best-known works, and also includes previously unreleased outtakes. Some of these outtakes subsequently appeared on both the reissues of Simon & Garfunkel's five studio albums as well as the later boxed set The Columbia Studio Recordings (1964-1970).

Track listing

Disc 1
 "Bleecker Street" - 2:44Recorded: March 10, 1964Previously unissued demo version
 "The Sound of Silence" - 3:07Recorded: March 10, 1964From the album Wednesday Morning, 3 A.M. (1964)
 "The Sun Is Burning" - 2:48Recorded: March 17, 1964From the album Wednesday Morning, 3 A.M.
 "Wednesday Morning, 3 A.M." - 2:15Recorded: March 17, 1964From the album Wednesday Morning, 3 A.M.
 "He Was My Brother" - 2:50Recorded: March 17, 1964From the album Wednesday Morning, 3 A.M.
 "Sparrow" - 2:48Recorded: March 31, 1964From the album Wednesday Morning, 3 A.M.
 "Peggy-O" - 2:26Recorded: March 31, 1964From the album Wednesday Morning, 3 A.M.
 "Benedictus" - 2:39Recorded: March 31, 1964From the album Wednesday Morning, 3 A.M.
 "Somewhere They Can't Find Me" - 2:36Recorded: April 5, 1965From the album Sounds of Silence (1966)
 "We've Got a Groovy Thing Goin'" - 1:59Recorded: April 5, 1965From the album Sounds of Silence
 "Leaves That Are Green" - 2:22Recorded: December 13, 1965From the album Sounds of Silence
 "Richard Cory" - 2:57Recorded: December 14, 1965From the album Sounds of Silence
 "I Am a Rock" - 2:51Recorded: December 14, 1965From the album Sounds of Silence
 "The Sound of Silence" - 3:07Recorded: March 10, 1964 (Basic track); June 15, 1965 (overdubs)From the album Sounds of Silence
 "Homeward Bound" - 2:30Recorded: December 14, 1965From the album Parsley, Sage, Rosemary and Thyme (U.S. version) (1966); Sounds of Silence (UK version)
 "Blues Run the Game" - 2:53Recorded: December 21, 1965Previously unissued outtake from the Sounds of Silence sessions
 "Kathy's Song" - 3:19Recorded: December 21, 1965From the album Sounds of Silence
 "April Come She Will" - 1:50Recorded: December 21, 1965From the album Sounds of Silence
 "Flowers Never Bend with the Rainfall" - 2:10Recorded: March 28, 1966From the album Parsley, Sage, Rosemary and Thyme

Disc 2
"Patterns" - 2:47Recorded: June 8, 1966From the album Parsley, Sage, Rosemary and Thyme
"Cloudy" - 2:23Recorded: June 10, 1966From the album Parsley, Sage, Rosemary and Thyme
"The Dangling Conversation" - 2:38Recorded: June 21, 1966From the album Parsley, Sage, Rosemary and Thyme
"Scarborough Fair/Canticle" - 3:12Recorded: July 26, 1966From the album Parsley, Sage, Rosemary and Thyme
"The 59th Street Bridge Song (Feelin' Groovy)" - 1:55Recorded: August 16, 1966From the album Parsley, Sage, Rosemary and Thyme
"For Emily, Whenever I May Find Her" - 2:06Recorded: August 22, 1966From the album Parsley, Sage, Rosemary and Thyme
"7 O'Clock News/Silent Night" - 2:04Recorded: August 22, 1966From the album Parsley, Sage, Rosemary and Thyme
"A Hazy Shade of Winter" - 2:17Recorded: September 7, 1966From the album Bookends (1968)
"At the Zoo" - 2:24Recorded: January 18, 1967From the album Bookends
"A Poem on the Underground Wall" - 4:30Recorded: January 22, 1967Previously unissued live recording (Lincoln Center, Manhattan, New York City, New York)
"Red Rubber Ball" - 2:28Recorded: January 22, 1967Previously unissued live recording (Lincoln Center, Manhattan, New York City, New York)
"Blessed" - 3:39Recorded: January 22, 1967Previously unissued live recording (Lincoln Center, Manhattan, New York City, New York)
"Anji" - 2:29Recorded: January 22, 1967Previously unissued live recording (Lincoln Center, Manhattan, New York City, New York)
"A Church Is Burning" - 3:29Recorded: January 22, 1967Previously unissued live recording (Lincoln Center, Manhattan, New York City, New York)
"Fakin' It" - 3:19Recorded: June 6, 1967From the album Bookends
"Save the Life of My Child" - 2:49Recorded: December 14, 1967From the album Bookends
"America" - 3:37Recorded: February 1, 1968From the album Bookends
"You Don't Know Where Your Interest Lies" - 2:20Recorded: June 14, 1967B-side to the "Fakin' It" single
"Punky's Dilemma" - 2:14Recorded: October 5, 1967From the album Bookends
"Comfort and Joy" - 1:51Recorded: April 19, 1967Previously unissued Christmas recording
"Star Carol" - 1:46Recorded: April 19, 1967Christmas recording, previously appeared on Columbia Special Products compilations A Very Merry Christmas (1967) and Dreaming of a White Christmas (1981)

Disc 3
"Mrs. Robinson" - 4:04Recorded: February 2, 1968From the album Bookends
"Old Friends/Bookends" - 3:57Recorded: March 8, 1968From the album Bookends
"Overs" - 3:05Recorded: October 13, 1968Previously unissued live recording (Memorial Auditorium, Burlington, Vermont)
"A Most Peculiar Man" - 2:35Recorded: October 13, 1968Previously unissued live recording (Memorial Auditorium, Burlington, Vermont)
"Bye Bye Love" - 2:45Recorded: October 13, 1968Previously unissued live recording (Memorial Auditorium, Burlington, Vermont)
"The Boxer" - 5:09Recorded: November 16, 1968From the album Bridge over Troubled Water (1970)
"Baby Driver" - 3:16Recorded: November 19, 1968From the album Bridge over Troubled Water
"Why Don't You Write Me" - 2:46Recorded: June 13, 1969From the album Bridge over Troubled Water
"Feuilles-O" - 1:42Recorded: August 11, 1969Previously unissued demo
"Keep the Customer Satisfied" - 2:36Recorded: October 27, 1969From the album Bridge over Troubled Water
"So Long, Frank Lloyd Wright" - 3:43Recorded: October 28, 1969From the album Bridge over Troubled Water
"Song for the Asking" - 1:51Recorded: November 1, 1969From the album Bridge over Troubled Water
"Cecilia" - 2:56Recorded: November 2, 1969From the album Bridge over Troubled Water
"El Condor Pasa (If I Could)" - 3:08Recorded: November 2, 1969From the album Bridge over Troubled Water
"Bridge over Troubled Water" - 4:54Recorded: November 9, 1969From the album Bridge over Troubled Water
"The Only Living Boy in New York" - 4:00Recorded: November 15, 1969From the album Bridge over Troubled Water
"Hey, Schoolgirl/Black Slacks" - 1:32Recorded: November 28, 1969Previously unissued live recording (Carnegie Hall, New York City, New York)
"That Silver-Haired Daddy of Mine" - 3:28Recorded: November 28, 1969Previously unissued live recording (Carnegie Hall, New York City, New York)
"My Little Town" - 3:50Recorded: May 1975Previously appeared on Paul Simon's album Still Crazy After All These Years and Art Garfunkel's album Breakaway (both from 1975)

Charts

Certifications

References

Simon & Garfunkel compilation albums
1997 compilation albums
Albums produced by Roy Halee
Albums produced by Bob Johnston
Albums produced by Tom Wilson (record producer)
Albums produced by Paul Simon
Albums produced by Art Garfunkel
Albums produced by John Simon (record producer)
Albums produced by Phil Ramone
Columbia Records compilation albums
Legacy Recordings compilation albums